The 5th Krajina (Kozara) Assault Brigade was a World War II military unit of the Yugoslav Partisans. It was formed on September 22, 1942, at Palež on the Kozara mountain out of the 2nd 'Mladen Stojanović' Partisan Detachment. On the day of the brigade was formed it had around 1,100 soldiers armed with 940 rifles and 45 light machine-guns.

During actions in September and October 1943, the brigade killed 76 enemy soldiers and one officer, taking as prisoners a further 22 soldiers and one officer, while capturing 25 rifles, 1 light machine-gun, 2 submachine-guns, and 2 pistols, also destroying 5 trucks. These actions raised attention of German 714th Infantry division since it was thought that Kozara was pacified during Spring offensive forcing brigade to leave Kozara to before another offensive was launched.
The unit later participated in many operations, among others the Belgrade Offensive.

Footnotes

Bibliography

See also

 18th (Croatian) Eastern Bosnian Brigade
 Yugoslav Partisans
 Yugoslav People's Liberation War
 Seven anti-Partisan offensives
 Resistance during World War II

Brigades of the Yugoslav Partisans
Military units and formations established in 1942